Gregory J. Matthews (born in Gresham, Oregon) is an American politician and a former Democratic member of the Oregon House of Representatives, where he represented District 50 from 2009 to 2015.

Education
Matthews graduated from Gresham High School.

Elections
2008 To challenge incumbent Republican Representative and former state Senator John Lim for the House District 50 seat, Matthews was unopposed for the May 20, 2008 Democratic Primary, winning with 5,157 votes (61.4%), and won the November 4, 2008 General election with 13,868 votes (54.5%) against Representative Lim, who later ran for Governor of Oregon.
2010 Matthews was unopposed for the May 18, 2010, Democratic primary, winning with 3,568 votes, and won the November 2, 2010 General election with 10,550 votes (53.9%) against Republican nominee Andre Wang.
2012 Matthews was unopposed for the May 15, 2012, Democratic primary, winning with 2,955 votes, and won the November 6, 2012 General election with 13,856 votes (66.0%) against Republican nominee Logan Boettcher.

Matthews declined to seek reelection in 2014 after being appointed as chief of the Gresham Fire Department.

References

External links
 Official page at the Oregon Legislative Assembly
 Campaign site
 

Year of birth missing (living people)
Living people
American fire chiefs
Democratic Party members of the Oregon House of Representatives
Oregon police officers
People from Gresham, Oregon
United States Army soldiers
Gresham High School (Oregon) alumni
21st-century American politicians